Hadžiosmanović is a Bosniak surname in Herzegovina and Serbo-Croatian surname in Bosnia (middle parts of Bosnia ) . Notable people with the surname include:

Cristian Hadžiosmanović (born 1998), Italian-born Montenegrin footballer
Derviš Hadžiosmanović (born 1959), Montenegrin football coach and former player
Hatidža Hadžiosmanović (1938–2015), President of the Constitutional Court of Bosnia and Herzegovina

Bosnian surnames
Montenegrin surnames
Slavic-language surnames
Patronymic surnames